Rayito de luz (English: Ray of Light),  is a Mexican childhood telenovela. Alejandro Speitzer and Alan star as the protagonists, while Delia Casanova star as the antagonists. This soap opera is based on the book Marcelino pan y vino of José María Sánchez Silva, was recorded at Real del Monte, also known as Mineral del Monte, Hidalgo.

Plot 
It all begins when a boy named Abel Ventura comes to a quiet town called San Pedro Mountains to start a career in priesthood in the seminary Reutilicos Brothers.

He is a musician-minded priest who is fleeing the city because of a broken heart, hoping to find peace within and devote his life to God.

A year after his arrival Abel within the confessional to an abandoned along with a written in an unknown language for seminarians and all he could decipher was named "Juan de Luz" a child full of life seminar letter child.

Cast 
 Alejandro Speitzer as Juan de Luz "Rayito"
 Alan as Hermano Abel Ventura
 Mariana Levy as Francisca Buenrostro
 Gerardo Murguía as José Niño
 Aarón Hernán as Padre Constantino
 Delia Casanova as Gertrudis Montes 
 Luis de Icaza as Hermano Higinio Huerta
 Francisco Rossell as Hermano Fidel Rulfo
 Juan Carlos Casasola as Justino Hernández
 Tania Vázquez as Catalina Cienfuegos
 Bárbara Ferré as Hortensia Buenrostro
 Marcela Páez as Mirna López
 Vanessa Angers as Esther de Lerma
 Luis Gatica as Cruz Ramírez
 Oscar Traven as Florencio Lerma
 Rafael Rojas as Antonio Sánchez
 Roberto D’Amico as Dr. Domingo Mendieta
 Eduardo Quesada as Hermano Nacho
 Danna Paola Rivera as Lupita Lerma
 Hendrick Marine as Aldo Lerma
 Isamar Martínez as Vicky Lerma
 Martha Sabrina Martínez as Karina Ramírez
 Manuel Bermúdez as Óscar Sánchez
 Suzeth Cerame as Carmelita Sánchez
 Lourdes Munguía as Lucía Prado
 Susana González as Minilla

References

External links 
 

2000 telenovelas
Mexican telenovelas
2000 Mexican television series debuts
2001 Mexican television series endings
Televisa telenovelas
Television series about children
Spanish-language telenovelas